This is a list of Chinese photographers.

 Cang Xin
 Chen Man
 Chen Wei
 Hong Cheong
 Feng Xuemin
 Fu Bingchang
 He Chengyao
 Hou Bo
 Lai Afong
 Lang Jingshan
 Li Zhensheng
 Liu Xucang
 Lu Guang
 Lu Houmin
 Luo Yang
 Feng Li
 Ma Liuming
 Miao Xiaochun
 Mu Qing
 O Zhang
 Ren Hang
 Sam Tata
 Sha Fei
 Shao Hua
 Shen Wei
 Stephen Chow
 Yijun Liao
 Sun-chang Lo
 Tchan Fou-li
 Tong Cheong
 Wang Fuchun (1943–2021) – Chinese People on the Train, Black Land and Manchurian Tiger 
 Wang Qingsong
 Wu Shanzhuan
 Xu Xiaobing
 Yang Fudong
 John Yu Shuinling
 Zhao Xiaoding
 Zhang Jingna
 Zheng Guogu
 Zhuang Xueben
 Zhou Chengzhou

See also
List of Chinese women photographers
List of Chinese artists

Chinese photographers
Chinese
Photographers
Photography in China